Club Natació Sabadell Basketball, also known as CN Sabadell, is an amateur basketball team based in Sabadell, Catalonia, Spain. The team was founded in 1929, as a division of the CN Sabadell multi sports club. They play in Copa Catalunya

Season by season

References and notes

External links
Official website
Blog CN Sabadell Basquet

Sabadell
Catalan basketball teams
Basketball teams established in 1929
Former Liga EBA teams